Timofey Yefremovich Fan-der-Flit (16 July 1775 – 2 September 1843) was a statesman of the Russian Empire, Privy Councillor and Olonets Governor.

Biography 
His ancestors were merchants who moved in the first half of the 18th century from Holland to Arkhangelsk. Born in Saint Petersburg, in the family of Yefrem Ivanovich Fan-der-Flit, the head of the border guard and director of the Kronstadt customs.

After graduating from the Saint Petersburg Naval Cadet Corps in 1790, he served in the Imperial Navy.

In 1804, he retired with the rank of captain lieutenant and served in the Ministry of Finance.

In 1812, he was initiated into Freemasonry in the Saint Petersburg Lodge of "Елизаветы к добродетели".

Since 1816, he was appointed director of the Onega Timber Exchange in the Arkhangelsk Governorate.

In 1818, he was appointed vice-governor of the Arkhangelsk Governorate.

Between 1821 and 1824 he served as the vice-governor of the Kostroma Governorate.

From October 1825 to September 1827 he was governor of the Olonets Governorate.

From 1827 he was a member of the Council of the State Audit Office of the Ministry of Finance.

In 1828, he was granted nobility.

In 1841, he retired with the rank of privy councillor.

He was familiar with Alexander Pushkin, and he was friends with the Decembrist poet Fyodor Glinka, who was exiled to Petrozavodsk.

He died on 2 September 1843 in Saint Petersburg. He was buried at the Smolensky Lutheran Cemetery.

Family 

He was married to Tatyana Fyodorovna Sukhotina (1776—1854), daughter of major Fyodor Grigorievich Sukhotin (1743—1814), from the marriage to Anna Nikolaevna Sokovnina. Their children:
 Fyodor Timofeevich (1810—1873), senator, director of the Chancellery of the Ministry of Finance.
 Ekaterina Timofeevna (1812—1877), in her youth, Nestor Kukolnik was in love with her and sang her under the name "Lenora". In 1835, she was married to Rear Admiral Mikhail Petrovich Lazarev (1788-1851).
 Anna Timofeevna (1814—?), married to colonel Mikhail Nikolaevich Depreradovich (1807—1873).
 Alexandra Timofeevna (1818—1859), married since 13 November 1838 to Nikolai Aleksandrovich Aledinsky (1813—1868), the son of general Alexander Pavlovich Aledinsky.

References

Literature 
 Русский биографический словарь: В 25 т. / под наблюдением А. А. Половцова. 1896–1918.
 Мошина Т. А. Олонецкий губернатор Т. Е. Фан-дер-Флит // Север. 1988. No. 2;
 Серков А. И. Русское масонство. 1731—2000 гг. Энциклопедический словарь. — М.: Российская политическая энциклопедия, 2001.
 Краско А. Русские страницы в истории рода Van der Vliet // Голландцы и бельгиййцы в России XVIII—XX веков. СПб., 2004;
 Кораблёв Н. А., Т. А. Мошина. Олонецкие губернаторы и генерал-губернаторы: Биографический справочник. — Петрозаводск: «Строительный стандарт», 2012. — С. 50–55. — 140 с. — .

1775 births
1843 deaths
Russian Empire
Russian Freemasons
Burials at Smolensky Lutheran Cemetery